The 2017–18 Seton Hall Pirates men's basketball team represented Seton Hall University in the 2017–18 NCAA Division I men's basketball season. They were led by eighth-year head coach Kevin Willard. The Pirates played their home games at the Prudential Center in Newark, New Jersey and Walsh Gymnasium in South Orange, New Jersey as members of the Big East Conference. They finished the season 22–12, 10–8 in Big East play to finish in a three-way tie for third place. In the Big East tournament, they lost to Butler in the quarterfinals. They received an at-large bid to the NCAA tournament as the No. 8 seed in the Midwest region. There they defeated NC State in the first round before losing to Kansas in the second round.

Previous season
The Pirates finished the 2016–17 season 21–12, 10–8 in Big East play to finish in a four-way tie for third place. As the No. 5 seed in the Big East tournament, they defeated Marquette before losing to Villanova in the semifinals. They received an at-large bid to the NCAA tournament as a No. 9 seed in the South region where they lost to 8-seeded Arkansas on a controversial flagrant foul call late in the game in the first round.

Offseason

Returning players 
Following the season, junior forward Ángel Delgado declared himself eligible of the NBA draft, but did not hire an agent. On May 22, 2017, he withdrew his name from the draft and announced he would return to Seton Hall for his senior season. Junior guard Khadeen Carringon also announced he would make himself eligible for the NBA draft, but also withdrew his name from the draft to return to the Hall for his senior season.

Departures

Incoming transfers

Class of 2017 recruits

Preseason 
In its annual preseason preview, Blue Ribbon Yearbook ranked Seton Hall No. 15 in the country. Senior forward Ángel Delgado was named a fourth team All-American.

Seton Hall was picked to finish second in the Big East preseason Coaches' Poll. Khadeen Carrington and Angel Delgado were named to the preseason All-Big East First Team.

Roster

Schedule and results
 
|-
!colspan=9 style=| Exhibition

|-
!colspan=9 style=| Non-conference regular season

|-
!colspan=9 style=| Big East regular season

|-
!colspan=9 style=| Big East tournament

|-
!colspan=9 style=| NCAA tournament

  Game was suspended with 13:03 left in the 2nd half due to unsafe floor conditions and resumed at noon on February 22 at Alumni Hall.

Rankings

^Coaches did not release a Week 2 poll.
*AP does not release post-NCAA tournament rankings

References

Seton Hall
Seton Hall Pirates men's basketball seasons
Seton Hall
Seton Hall
Seton Hall